The 1970–71 FA Cup was the 90th season of the world's oldest football cup competition, the Football Association Challenge Cup, commonly known as the FA Cup. First Division champions Arsenal won the competition for the fourth time, beating Liverpool 2–1 in the final at Wembley. In doing so, Arsenal were the fourth team to complete a double of League and Cup victories, following Preston North End, Aston Villa and Tottenham Hotspur.

Matches were scheduled to be played at the stadium of the team named first on the date specified for each round, which was always a Saturday. Some matches, however, might be rescheduled for other days if there were clashes with games for other competitions or the weather was inclement. If scores were level after 90 minutes had been played, a replay would take place at the stadium of the second-named team later the same week. If the replayed match was drawn further replays would be held until a winner was determined. If scores were level after 90 minutes had been played in a replay, a 30-minute period of extra time would be played.

Calendar

Results

First round proper

At this stage clubs from the Football League Third and Fourth Divisions joined 28 non-league clubs having come through the qualifying rounds. To complete this round Macclesfield Town, Telford United, Enfield and Dagenham were given byes as finalists of FA Trophy and FA Amateur Cup of the last season. Matches were scheduled to be played on Saturday, 21 November 1970, with the exception of the Great Harwood–Rotherham United match, which was played the following Tuesday. Nine matches were drawn, of which one went to a second replay.

Second round proper
The matches were scheduled for Saturday, 12 December 1970. Six matches were drawn, with replays taking place later the same week or the week after. The Lincoln City–Bradford City match required a second replay, which was played on the 21 December.

Third round proper
The 44 First and Second Division clubs entered the competition at this stage. The matches were scheduled Saturday, 2 January 1971, but ten were played at later dates. Seven matches were drawn and went to replays.

Fourth round proper
The matches were scheduled for Saturday, 23 January 1971. Seven matches were drawn, of which one required a second replay.

Fifth Round Proper
The matches were scheduled for Saturday, 13 February 1971 with one fixture and two replays played three or four days later.

Sixth Round Proper

The four sixth round ties were played on the 6 March 1971. There were two replays in the midweek fixtures of the following week.

Semi-finals

The semi-final matches were played on Saturday, 27 March 1971 with the Arsenal–Stoke match needing a replay. Liverpool and Arsenal came through the semi-final round to meet at Wembley.

Replay

Third place playoff
Between 1970 and 1974, a third place playoff between the two losing semi-finalists was held.

Final

The 1971 FA Cup Final was contested by Arsenal and Liverpool at Wembley on the 8 May 1971.  Arsenal won 2–1 after extra time, with all three goals coming in the added half-hour. Steve Heighway scored for Liverpool first, before Arsenal equalised with a scrambled goal from substitute Eddie Kelly - the first time a substitute had ever scored in an FA Cup final. Charlie George scored the winner six minutes into the second period.

TV Coverage

The rights to show FA Cup games were, as with Football League matches, shared between the BBC and ITV network. All games were shown in a highlights format, except the Final, which was shown live both on BBC1 and ITV. The BBC football highlights programme Match Of The Day would show up to three games and the various ITV regional network stations would cover up to one game and show highlights from other games covered elsewhere on the ITV network. The ITV region Anglia showed highlights of the Second Round tie between Colchester United and Cambridge United, it would be the last game from outside the third round covered by ITV until 1982. Highlights of replays would be shown on either the BBC or ITV.

See also
 1970–71 WFA Cup

References
General
The FA Cup Archive at TheFA.com
English FA Cup 1970/71 at Soccerbase
F.A. Cup results 1970/71 at Footballsite
Specific
 MOTD listings 

 
FA Cup seasons
Fa
Eng